is a Japanese badminton player.

Career summary 
In 2013, he competed at the Summer Universiade in Kazan, Russia. In 2014, he became the runner-up at the U.S. Open Grand Prix tournament in the men's doubles event partnered with Taiki Shimada.

Achievements

BWF World Tour (1 runner-up) 
The BWF World Tour, which was announced on 19 March 2017 and implemented in 2018, is a series of elite badminton tournaments sanctioned by the Badminton World Federation (BWF). The BWF World Tour is divided into levels of World Tour Finals, Super 1000, Super 750, Super 500, Super 300 (part of the HSBC World Tour), and the BWF Tour Super 100.

Men's doubles

BWF Grand Prix (1 runner-up) 
The BWF Grand Prix had two levels, the Grand Prix and Grand Prix Gold. It was a series of badminton tournaments sanctioned by the Badminton World Federation (BWF) and played between 2007 and 2017.

Men's doubles

  BWF Grand Prix Gold tournament
  BWF Grand Prix tournament

BWF International Challenge/Series (2 titles, 1 runner-up) 
Men's doubles

  BWF International Challenge tournament
  BWF International Series tournament

References

External links 
 

1992 births
Living people
Sportspeople from Saitama Prefecture
Japanese male badminton players
21st-century Japanese people